Benjamin McKinley may refer to:

Ben McKinley, Australian rules footballer
Benjamin McKinley, character in Alice Upside Down and Alice series